Zamora Municipality is one of the 18 municipalities (municipios) that makes up the Venezuelan state of Aragua and, according to the 2011 census by the National Institute of Statistics of Venezuela, the municipality has a population of 144,759.  The town of Villa de Cura is the municipal seat of the Zamora Municipality.

Name
The municipality is one of several named "Zamora Municipality" for the 19th century Venezuelan soldier Ezequiel Zamora.

History
The city of Villa de Cura was founded on May 25, 1722.

Demographics
The Zamora Municipality, according to a 2007 population estimate by the National Institute of Statistics of Venezuela, has a population of 145,742 (up from 127,595 in 2000). This amounts to 8.8% of the state's population.

Government
The mayor of the Zamora Municipality is Aldo Lovera, elected on November 23, 2008, with 55% of the vote. He replaced Stefano Mangione shortly after the elections. The municipality is divided into five parishes; Capital Zamora, Magdaleno, San Francisco de Asís, Valles de Tucutunemo, and Augusto Mijares (separated from San Francisco de Asís parish effective 16/12/97).

References

External links
 zamora-aragua.gob.ve  

Municipalities of Aragua